The Clam River is a  tributary of the Muskegon River in Wexford, Missaukee, and Clare counties in the U.S. state of Michigan. The source of the river is located in downtown Cadillac, at the eponymous Lake Cadillac, adjacent to Cadillac High School. The river flows east and southeast and ends at the Muskegon River a few miles north of Temple.

References

Michigan  Streamflow Data from the USGS

Rivers of Michigan
Rivers of Wexford County, Michigan
Rivers of Missaukee County, Michigan
Rivers of Clare County, Michigan
Tributaries of Lake Michigan